In genetics, chromosome translocation is a phenomenon that results in unusual rearrangement of chromosomes. This includes balanced and unbalanced translocation, with two main types: reciprocal-, and Robertsonian translocation. Reciprocal translocation is a chromosome abnormality caused by exchange of parts between non-homologous chromosomes. Two detached fragments of two different chromosomes are switched. Robertsonian translocation occurs when two non-homologous chromosomes get attached, meaning that given two healthy pairs of chromosomes, one of each pair "sticks" and blends together homogeneously.

A gene fusion may be created when the translocation joins two otherwise-separated genes. It is detected on cytogenetics or a karyotype of affected cells.  Translocations can be balanced (in an even exchange of material with no genetic information extra or missing, and ideally full functionality) or unbalanced (where the exchange of chromosome material is unequal resulting in extra or missing genes).

Reciprocal translocations
Reciprocal translocations are usually an exchange of material between non-homologous chromosomes and occur in about 1 in 491 live births. Such translocations are usually harmless, as they do not result in a gain or loss of genetic material, though they may be detected in prenatal diagnosis. However, carriers of balanced reciprocal translocations may create gametes with unbalanced chromosome translocations during meiotic chromosomal segregation. This can lead to infertility, miscarriages or children with abnormalities. Genetic counseling and genetic testing are often offered to families that may carry a translocation. Most balanced translocation carriers are healthy and do not have any symptoms.

It is important to distinguish between chromosomal translocations that occur in germ cells, due to errors in meiosis (i.e. during gametogenesis), and those that occur in somatic cells, due to errors in mitosis. The former results in a chromosomal abnormality featured in all cells of the offspring, as in translocation carriers. Somatic translocations, on the other hand, result in abnormalities featured only in the affected cell and its progenitors, as in chronic myelogenous leukemia with the Philadelphia chromosome translocation.

Nonreciprocal translocation

Nonreciprocal translocation involves the one-way transfer of genes from one chromosome to another nonhomologous chromosome.

Robertsonian translocations
Robertsonian translocation is a type of translocation caused by breaks at or near the centromeres of two acrocentric chromosomes. The reciprocal exchange of parts gives rise to one large metacentric chromosome and one extremely small chromosome that may be lost from the organism with little effect because it contains few genes. The resulting karyotype in humans leaves only 45 chromosomes, since two chromosomes have fused together.   This has no direct effect on the phenotype, since the only genes on the short arms of acrocentrics are common to all of them and are present in variable copy number (nucleolar organiser genes).

Robertsonian translocations have been seen involving all combinations of acrocentric chromosomes. The most common translocation in humans involves chromosomes 13 and 14 and is seen in about 0.97 / 1000 newborns. Carriers of Robertsonian translocations are not associated with any phenotypic abnormalities, but there is a risk of unbalanced gametes that lead to miscarriages or abnormal offspring.  For example, carriers of Robertsonian translocations involving chromosome 21 have a higher risk of having a child with Down syndrome. This is known as a 'translocation Downs'. This is due to a mis-segregation (nondisjunction) during gametogenesis. The mother has a higher (10%) risk of transmission than the father (1%). Robertsonian translocations involving chromosome 14 also carry a slight risk of uniparental disomy 14 due to trisomy rescue.

Role in disease
Some human diseases caused by translocations are:
 Cancer: Several forms of cancer are caused by acquired translocations (as opposed to those present from conception); this has been described mainly in leukemia (acute myelogenous leukemia and chronic myelogenous leukemia). Translocations have also been described in solid malignancies such as Ewing's sarcoma.
 Infertility: One of the would-be parents carries a balanced translocation, where the parent is asymptomatic but conceived fetuses are not viable.
 Down syndrome is caused in a minority (5% or less) of cases by a Robertsonian translocation of the chromosome 21 long arm onto the long arm of chromosome 14.

Chromosomal translocations between the sex chromosomes can also result in a number of genetic conditions, such as
 XX male syndrome: caused by a translocation of the SRY gene from the Y to the X chromosome

By chromosome

Denotation
The International System for Human Cytogenetic Nomenclature (ISCN) is used to denote a translocation between chromosomes.  The designation t(A;B)(p1;q2) is used to denote a translocation between chromosome A and chromosome B. The information in the second set of parentheses, when given, gives the precise location within the chromosome for chromosomes A and B respectively—with p indicating the short arm of the chromosome, q indicating the long arm, and the numbers after p or q refers to regions, bands and sub-bands seen when staining the chromosome with a staining dye. See also the definition of a genetic locus.

The translocation is the mechanism that can cause a gene to move from one linkage group to another.

Examples of translocations on human chromosomes

History
In 1938, Karl Sax, at the Harvard University Biological Laboratories, published a paper entitled "Chromosome Aberrations Induced by X-rays", which demonstrated that radiation could induce major genetic changes by affecting chromosomal translocations. The paper is thought to mark the beginning of the field of radiation cytology, and led him to be called "the father of radiation cytology".

DNA double-strand break repair

The initiating event in the formation of a translocation is generally a double-strand break in chromosomal DNA.  A type of DNA repair that has a major role in generating chromosomal translocations is the non-homologous end joining pathway.  When this pathway functions appropriately it restores a DNA double-strand break by reconnecting the originally broken ends, but when it acts inappropriately it may join ends incorrectly resulting in genomic rearrangements including translocations.  In order for the illegitimate joining of broken ends to occur, the exchange partners DNAs need to be physically close to each other in the 3D genome.

See also
 Accipitridae
 Aneuploidy
 Chromosome abnormalities
 DbCRID
 Fusion gene
 Pseudodiploid
 Takifugu rubripes

References

External links 
 

Chromosomal abnormalities
Cytogenetics
Modification of genetic information